Evil Laugh is a 1986 American slasher film  directed and starring Dominick Brascia, Jr. and stars Myles O'Brien, Jerold Pearson, and Kim McKamy. The film is about a group of medical students attacked by a masked killer while repairing a building over the weekend.

Plot
A decade ago, an orphanage has been rebuilt after being burned down following accusations of child molestation and abuse from the building's custodian, resulting him to A group of medical students is brought in by pediatrician-turned-doctor to rebuild the building as a foster home, as a psychotic masked assailant stalks them.

Cast
 Kim McKamy as Connie
 Steven Baio as Johnny
 Tony Griffin as Sammy
 Jerold Pearson as Barney
 Myles O'Brien as Mark
 Jody Gibson as  Tina
 Howard Weiss as  Mr. Burns
 Karyn O'Bryan as  Betty
 Susan Grant as Sadie
 Gary Hays as Jerry
 Hal Shafer as Chief Cash
 Johnny Venocur as Freddy
 Tom Shell as Delivery Boy
 Dominick Brascia as Evil Laugher

Reception
In his overview of horror films from the 1980s, Scott Aaron Stine described the film as "effortless tripe" and that "There is nothing, I repeat, nothing worthwhile or even remotely worthwhile or even remotely memorable about this waste of celluloid."

References

Footnotes

Sources

External links

 

American serial killer films
American slasher films
1986 horror films
1986 films
American comedy horror films
American exploitation films
1980s slasher films
American splatter films
1980s American films

fi:Nauraminen#Paha nauru